South Baltimore is a neighborhood in the Southern District of Baltimore, located to the west of the neighborhood of Riverside and south of Federal Hill. Its boundaries are marked by East Ostend Street (north), Light Street (east), Race Street (west) and Interstate 95 (south).

Landmarks
Heath Street Park, a small neighborhood park, is located along Heath Street between South Charles Street and Harden Court.

See also
List of Baltimore neighborhoods

External links

South Baltimore Neighborhood Association
South Baltimore's Oldest Community Website

References

 
Neighborhoods in Baltimore